Costanzo Ciano, 1st Count of Cortellazzo and Buccari (30 August 1876 – 26 June 1939) was an Italian naval officer and politician. He was the father of Galeazzo Ciano.

Biography

Early life
Born at Livorno, he was the son of Raimondo Ciano and his wife, Argia Puppo. He entered the Livorno Naval Academy in 1891 and was commissioned an officer five years later. In 1901, he became Ship-of-the-Line Lieutenant (tenente di vascello) and took part in the Italo-Turkish War of 1911–1912.

First World War
In 1915, before the entrance of Italy to the First World War, he was a capitano di corvetta (lieutenant commander) and was assigned to serve in Cirenaica.

After his return to Italy, he operated at the command of fast MAS units and received a gold medal for military value for a famous action in Bakar Harbour in Croatian Littoral, which was later celebrated by the poet Gabriele D'Annunzio, who had also participated.

Ciano was appointed senior commander at the end of the war and ennobled by King Victor Emmanuel III as Conte di Cortellazzo e Buccari''.

Postwar fascist
Ciano's ardent nationalism drew him into fascism. He became leader of the Livorno fascio and participated in the March on Rome in October 1922.

On 31 October 1919, he assumed the post of Undersecretary of State for the Regia Marina and was Commissioner for the Merchant Navy. On 9 November 1923, he was appointed rear admiral in the Naval Reserve. He was the president of the Italian Chamber of Deputies from 1934 until his death, which occurred at Ponte a Moriano in 1939.

Awards and decorations

References

External links
 

1876 births
1939 deaths
People from Livorno
Italian nobility
Italian Nationalist Association
Members of the Grand Council of Fascism
Government ministers of Italy
Mussolini Cabinet
Presidents of the Chamber of Deputies (Italy)
Deputies of Legislature XXVI of the Kingdom of Italy
Deputies of Legislature XXVII of the Kingdom of Italy
Deputies of Legislature XXVIII of the Kingdom of Italy
Deputies of Legislature XXIX of the Kingdom of Italy
Members of the Chamber of Fasces and Corporations
Politicians of Tuscany
Italian admirals
Italian military personnel of the Italo-Turkish War
Italian military personnel of World War I
Recipients of the Order of Saints Maurice and Lazarus